Catbus is a character in the film My Neighbor Totoro. The term can also refer to:

 Capital Area Transit (Raleigh), public transportation in Raleigh, North Carolina
 Capital Area Transit (Harrisburg), public transportation system in Harrisburg, Pennsylvania
 Clemson Area Transit, Clemson, South Carolina's transit system, also known as CATbus
 Perth Central Area Transit, Perth (Australia), Central Area Transit (CAT Bus)